The Raycolt ( "Hyeonma", Hanja: 現馬) or the Kia Light Tactical Vehicle (KLTV) is an Infantry mobility vehicle released by South Korea's Kia Motors. It entered full production in 2016 and entered service with the Republic of Korea Army the same year.

It was originally designed to meet the needs of the South Korean armed forces, and was developed with assistance and funding from the South Korean Ministry of National Defense. It is also eyed as a replacement for the existing fleet of Kia KM420 and KM450 utility vehicles in South Korean military service.

History
The Kia KLTV was first displayed in the International Defence Exhibition and Conference (IDEX) 2015 held in Abu Dhabi, UAE. It has also been displayed several times in global defense exhibitions. It officially entered production in June 2016.

The KLTV Weapon Carrier, which is designated K151 in ROK service, was displayed in Asian Defense, Security & Crisis Management Exhibition and Conference (ADAS) 2016 and 2018 in Manila, Philippines, which is a huge market for military vehicles from Kia Motors. Kia announced that two KLTVs were in the Philippines during the ADAS 2018 event for testing.

The KLTV181 Armored Personnel Carrier variant, which is officially called K152 in ROK service, was presented in Defense Expo (DX) Korea 2018. The K151 Weapon Carrier was also displayed at the International Defense Exhibition and Seminar (IDEAS) 2018 in Karachi, Pakistan, as interest from the Pakistani Army on the vehicle was said to be high.

In 2018, the KLTV is being proposed to the Pakistani Army in a partnership effort with the Hajvairy Group during the IDEAS 2018 convention.

As of 2019, the Philippines has received three KLTVs for technical evaluation.

Operational history
Kia KLTV is currently operated by the armed forces of the Republic of Korea and Mali. The Kia KLTV has been used in UN peacekeeping operations in Lebanon and in South Sudan by South Korea. It is also being used by the Malian Armed Forces for counter-insurgency operation.

Design
Compared to previous generation of light utility vehicles developed by Kia, the KLTV was designed combining mobility, survivability, and practicality in mind. It was developed with modularization of its basic chassis and using for various derivative models including standard, long wheel base, armored, and armed variants.

The basic 4-door variant can carry one driver and three passengers, while a single-cab variant is also available. Modular compartments can be used on both single and double cab variants.

Both standard and armored variants are available, with the armored variant having extra protection including bullet-proof windshields and door glass, composite panels and doors, mine-protected flooring, blast-absorbing seats, and gunner protective armor. Dyneema is collaborating with Kia Motors in using its lightweight armor with the KLTVs.

Weapons can be mounted on the roof opening, including manually-operated canopy weapon mounts or remote-controlled weapon systems. Weapon mounts could be for 7.62mm or 12.7mm machine guns, 40mm automatic grenade launchers, or anti-tank missiles.

A 10kw power generator can be added to provide power for RCWS and other equipment like  communication radios and computers, special equipment and other electric-operated optional equipment.

Variants
1. Standard Wheel Base Standard Cabin:
- KLTV280 Multi-Purpose Vehicle
- KLTV223 Cargo Truck

2. Standard Wheel Base Armored Cabin:
- KLTV141 Armored Command Vehicle
- KLTV181 Armored Personnel Carrier - officially designated K152, can carry up to 7 passengers
- KLTV182 Armored Reconnaissance Vehicle
- Weapon Carrier (Manually-operated Missile) - officially designated K153C
- Weapon Carrier (Manually-operated Machine Gun) - officially designated K151
- Remote Control Weapon Carrier

3. Long Wheel Base Standard Cabin:
- Cargo Truck
- Shop Van
- KLTV240 Cab Chassis Truck
- Shelter Cargo Truck
- NBC Reconnaissance Vehicle

Operators

  – KLTV began entering service in 2016. 
  – Malian military began receiving Kia KLTVs in 2017 for use by FORSAT forces.
  – Nigerian army began receiving Kia KLTVs in 2020. At least one KLTV was spotted brand new with the factory sticker on the windscreen.
  – The Armed Forces of the Philippines was provided with a few units by Kia Motors. Most are with the Philippine Army, and at least 1 is with the Philippine Marine Corps.
  – State Border Service of Turkmenistan operates at least dozen KLTV.
  – KLTV181 version acquired in December 2022 for the Chilean Marine Corps.

Non-State Actors
  – One of the KLTVs shipped to the Nigerian Army was captured by Islamic State - West Africa Province in December 2020.

References 

Vehicles introduced in 2016
Military vehicles introduced in the 2010s
Military light utility vehicles
Kia vehicles
Military vehicles of South Korea